The Hakuicheon is a river in Uiwang and Anyang, South Korea.  It has its source on the slopes of Baekunsan in the city of Uiwang, at the foot of which it forms Baekun Lake, from which it then flows west into Anyang, where it joins the Anyangcheon.  The river has a path alongside providing easy access.

Gallery

See also
Rivers of Korea
Geography of South Korea

References

Rivers of South Korea